The Mark 26 torpedo was a submarine-launched anti-surface ship torpedo designed by Westinghouse Electric in 1944 as an improved version of the Mark 28 torpedo.

The Mark 26 was first to use Bell Telephone Laboratories' seawater battery, an explosive impulse start gyro and an electric steering and depth control. Production of the Mark 26 was deferred in favor of the Mark 16 torpedo.

See also
American 21 inch torpedo

References

Torpedoes
Torpedoes of the United States
Unmanned underwater vehicles